Vasilios Zagaritis (born 4 May 2001) is a Greek professional footballer who plays as a left-back for Serie B club Parma.

Career

Panathinaikos
In 2015, Zagaritis joined the youth ranks of Panathinaikos from PAS Kithairon Kaparelli.

On 14 January 2019, he signed a professional contract with Panathinaikos lasting for two-and-a-half years. On 1 March 2020, he played his first Super League game for them in a 4–1 win against Volos.

Parma 
On 22 January 2021, Parma announced the signing of Zagaritis on a contract lasting until 30 June 2024. On 17 May 2021, o Zagarítis made his debut with Parma, playing as a late substitute in a 1-3 home loss match against Sassuolo for the penultimate match of Serie A.

Career statistics

References

2001 births
Footballers from Thebes, Greece
Living people
Greek footballers
Association football midfielders
Greece under-21 international footballers
Greece youth international footballers
Super League Greece players
Serie A players
Panathinaikos F.C. players
Parma Calcio 1913 players
Greek expatriate footballers
Expatriate footballers in Italy
Greek expatriate sportspeople in Italy